The WWE 24/7 Championship was a professional wrestling championship created and promoted by the American professional wrestling promotion WWE. Open to anyone, regardless of gender or WWE employment status, the championship was defended "24/7", as in any time, anywhere, as long as a WWE referee was present. Because of this rule, the championship was available to all of WWE's brand divisions: their two main roster brands, Raw and SmackDown, and their developmental brand, NXT, with title changes also occurring outside of regular shows, often with videos posted on the company's website and social media accounts. The title was previously also available to the 205 Live and NXT UK brands before their respective closures in 2022. It was similar to the previous WWE Hardcore Championship, which also had a "24/7 rule".

The championship was introduced on the May 20, 2019, episode of Monday Night Raw, during which Titus O'Neil from Raw became the inaugural champion by securing the title belt first in a scramble involving several other wrestlers. The final champion was Nikki Cross, also from Raw. She defeated Dana Brooke on the November 7, 2022, episode of Raw and afterwards backstage, she discarded the championship as trash, and WWE subsequently retired the title.

Over the championship's three-year history, there were 202 officially recognized reigns between 57 different people; there are 3 reigns that are not recognized on the official title history on WWE.com. R-Truth had the most reigns at 54 and the longest combined reign at 425 days (53 and 415 days, respectively, as recognized by WWE). Reggie's first reign was the longest singular reign at 112 days. Tucker's first reign was the shortest reign, which lasted approximately four seconds. WWE Hall of Famer Pat Patterson was the oldest champion, winning the title at 78 years old (which also made him the oldest title holder in WWE history), while Puerto Rican singer Bad Bunny was the youngest, winning the title at 26. WWE Hall of Famer "The Million Dollar Man" Ted DiBiase and R-Truth were the only title holders to become champion without winning the title; DiBiase purchased it from fellow Hall of Famer Alundra Blayze, who was about to drop the belt into a trash can (reenacting the infamous incident where she did the same to the then-WWF Women's Championship after joining World Championship Wrestling in 1995), while R-Truth's 50th reign began after he convinced Bad Bunny to exchange the title for some "Stone Cold" Steve Austin memorabilia. The Revival (Scott Dawson and Dash Wilder) were the only tag team to win the title and were recognized as co-champions.

There were 15 non-wrestlers to win the title, including Fox sportscaster Rob Stone, WWE Senior Account Manager Michael Giaccio, former NFL, CFL, and USFL player Doug Flutie, and WWE commentators Corey Graves and Byron Saxton, and WWE referees Daphanie LaShaunn, Eddie Orengo, and Shawn Bennett.

Title history 
Note: Unless otherwise noted, the fall took place in the ring.

Combined reigns

See also 

 Ironman Heavymetalweight Championship – a title with a similar 24/7 rule

Notes

References

External links 
Official WWE 24/7 Championship title history
Wrestling-Titles.Com WWE 24/7 Championship title history

WWE championships lists